Metraeopsis is a monotypic moth genus of the family Crambidae described by Paul Dognin in 1905. It contains only one species, Metraeopsis cuneatalis, described in the same article, which is found in Loja Province, Ecuador.

References

Spilomelinae
Crambidae genera
Monotypic moth genera
Taxa named by Paul Dognin